George Owen Gore II (born December 15, 1982) is an American actor and comedian. He is best known for portraying Gregory "G" Williams on the FOX series New York Undercover from 1994 to 1998 and Michael Kyle, Jr. on the ABC sitcom My Wife and Kids from 2001 to 2005. He was also one of the main characters in the cast of the comedy Second Generation Wayans. Throughout his career, Gore has received four NAACP Image Award nominations.

Career
Gore made his acting debut at age 9 in 1992, appearing as Brian in Juice. His first major role was Gregory "G" Williams, the son of Malik Yoba's character, on crime drama New York Undercover, appearing on the series from 1994 to 1998. Gore received several accolades for his work on New York Undercover, all nominations: three NAACP Image Awards, one Young Artist Award (1997), and a YoungStar Award (1998). He had a small role in horror film The Devil's Advocate (1997). While continuing his acting career as a teenager, Gore was a student at Suitland High School.

In 2001, he was cast as Michael Kyle, Jr. (who went by Junior) on sitcom My Wife and Kids. Gore claimed that he had to adjust to the comedic setting of the series, having mostly acted in more dramatic works up to that point. For his work on this series, he was nominated in 2004 for the NAACP Image Award for Outstanding Supporting Actor in a Comedy Series. It marked his fourth NAACP Image Award nomination overall. Additionally, Gore earned his second Young Artist Award nomination in 2003. Gore continued playing the role until the series ended in 2005.

His other television credits include guest roles on Law & Order and Touched by an Angel. Gore appeared in the 2009 film Dance Flick, and played a fictionalized version of himself in Second Generation Wayans.

Behind the scenes, Gore directed one episode of My Wife and Kids ("Outbreak Monkey"), wherein LeBron James makes a guest appearance. He co-wrote the screenplay for Sneakerella (2022), a modern adaptation of fairy tale Cinderella.

Filmography

Film

Television

Director

References

External links
 

African-American male actors
American male child actors
American male film actors
American male television actors
Living people
1982 births